Jaka Kolenc (born 23 February 1994) is a Slovenian professional footballer who plays as a midfielder for Polish club Chrobry Głogów.

References

External links
NZS profile 

1994 births
People from Nova Gorica
Living people
Slovenian footballers
Association football midfielders
ND Gorica players
NK Brda players
Chrobry Głogów players
Slovenian PrvaLiga players
Slovenian Second League players
I liga players
Slovenian expatriate footballers
Slovenian expatriate sportspeople in Poland
Expatriate footballers in Poland